Big Lake Wildlife Management Area, (WMA) also referred to as Big Lake State WMA, is a  tract of protected land located in Franklin, Tensas, and Madison Parish, Louisiana, owned and managed by the Louisiana Department of Wildlife and Fisheries (LDWF).

WMA land acquisition
The land for the WMA was purchased through the Rockefeller Fund between 1983 and 1985.

Location
The location of the WMA is south of the Tensas River National Wildlife Refuge. The Tensas River snakes through portions of the WMA as well as providing the eastern border at several locations. Winnsboro, Crowville, and Swampers are to the west, with Swamper being the closest.

See also
List of Louisiana Wildlife Management Areas

References

Wildlife management areas of the United States
Wildlife management areas of Louisiana
Protected areas of Louisiana
Geography of Franklin Parish, Louisiana
Geography of Tensas Parish, Louisiana
Geography of Madison Parish, Louisiana
Protected areas established in 1983
1983 establishments in Louisiana